The United States sent a delegation to compete at the 1980 Summer Paralympics in Arnhem, Netherlands. Its athletes finished first in the gold and overall medal count.

See also 
 1980 Summer Paralympics
 1980 Summer Olympics boycott

References

External links
International Paralympic Committee Official Website
United States Paralympic Committee Official Website

Nations at the 1980 Summer Paralympics
1980
Summer Paralympics